Robert E. Ireland (1929 - February 4, 2012) was an American chemist and the Thomas Jefferson Chair Professor of chemistry at the University of Virginia. He is best known for his textbook Organic Synthesis and his contributions to the Ireland–Claisen rearrangement chemical reaction.

Academic career
Ireland earned his A.B. in chemistry in 1951 at Amherst College and earned his Ph.D. in chemistry in 1954 from the University of Wisconsin with William Summer Johnson, and did his postdoctoral work at UCLA with William Gould Young. In 1956, he joined the chemistry department of University of Michigan. In 1965, he became a professor of organic chemistry at the California Institute of Technology. In 1985 he became the director of the Merrell Dow Research Institute in Strasbourg, France. A year later, he became the chair of the chemistry department of University of Virginia.

Awards and honors
Ernest Guenther Award, 1977

Personal life
Ireland was married to wife Margaret and has two sons, Mark and Robert.

References

1929 births
2012 deaths
American chemists
Organic chemists
Amherst College alumni
University of Wisconsin–Madison alumni
University of Michigan faculty
California Institute of Technology faculty
University of Virginia faculty